Mokhtar Naili (born 3 September 1953) is a Tunisian former footballer who played as a goalkeeper for Club Africain and the Tunisia national team. He played in all three of Tunisia's matches at the 1978 FIFA World Cup.

References

1953 births
Living people
Tunisian footballers
Association football goalkeepers
Tunisia international footballers
Club Africain players
1978 FIFA World Cup players
1982 African Cup of Nations players